A cervical rib in humans is an extra rib which arises from the seventh cervical vertebra. Their presence is a congenital abnormality located above the normal first rib. A cervical rib is estimated to occur in 0.2% to 0.5% (1 in 200 to 500) of the population. People may have a cervical rib on the right, left or both sides.

Most cases of cervical ribs are not clinically relevant and do not have symptoms; cervical ribs are generally discovered incidentally, most often during x-rays and CT scans. However, they vary widely in size and shape, and in rare cases, they may cause problems such as contributing to thoracic outlet syndrome, because of pressure on the nerves that may be caused by the presence of the rib.

A cervical rib represents a persistent ossification of the C7 lateral costal element. During early development, this ossified costal element typically becomes re-absorbed. Failure of this process results in a variably elongated transverse process or complete rib that can be anteriorly fused with the T1 first rib below.

Diagnosis

On imaging, cervical ribs can be distinguished because their transverse processes are directed inferolaterally, whereas those of the adjacent thoracic spine are directed anterolaterally.

Associated conditions
The presence of a cervical rib can cause a form of thoracic outlet syndrome due to compression of the lower trunk of the brachial plexus or subclavian artery. These structures become encroached upon by the cervical rib and scalene muscles.

Compression of the brachial plexus may be identified by weakness of the muscles in the hand, near the base of the thumb. Compression of the subclavian artery is often diagnosed by finding a positive Adson's sign on examination, where the radial pulse in the arm is lost during abduction and external rotation of the shoulder. A positive Adson's sign is non-specific for the presence of a cervical rib however, as many individuals without a cervical rib will have a positive test. Compression of the sympathetic chain may cause Horner's syndrome.

Other animals
Many vertebrates, especially reptiles, have cervical ribs as a normal part of their anatomy rather than a pathological condition. Some sauropods had exceptionally long cervical ribs; those of Mamenchisaurus hochuanensis were nearly 4 meters long.

In birds, the cervical ribs are small and completely fused to the vertebrae.

In mammals, the ventral parts of the transverse processes of the cervical vertebrae are the fused-on cervical ribs.

Recent studies have also found a high percent of cervical ribs in woolly mammoths. It is believed that the decline in mammoth numbers may have forced inbreeding within the species which in turn had increased the number of mammoths being born with cervical ribs. Cervical ribs have been connected with leukaemia in human children, so it has given scientists new evidence to believe that the mammoth's extinction was attributed to the condition.

References

External links 

Supernumerary body parts
Congenital disorders of musculoskeletal system
Human anatomy